MOIS may refer to:

 Ministry of the Interior and Safety (South Korea)
 Ministry of Intelligence (Iran)